John Anthony Castino (born October 23, 1954) is a former Major League Baseball player. Castino played as an infielder, primarily at third base and second base, with the Minnesota Twins from 1979 through 1984.

Professional career
Castino graduated from New Trier High School in Winnetka, Illinois. Castino attended and played baseball for Rollins College, in Winter Park, Florida. He is considered the best player in Rollins history.

Castino was drafted by the Minnesota Twins in the 3rd round of the 1976 amateur draft. Castino made his major league debut with the Twins on April 6, 1979. He played well and ended the season with a .285 batting average and 112 hits in 148 games. His performance led him to be voted as Rookie of the Year, along with Alfredo Griffin, who he tied in voting.

The next season, Castino hit a career-high .302, and the year after that he led the American League with 9 triples. A good fielder, he switched to second base in 1982 and led the league's second basemen in fielding percentage that year. However, Castino started to suffer from chronic back pain, and his career was cut short in 1984 by a fused disc in his back. He played his final game with the Twins on May 7, 1984.

After his baseball career ended, Castino went back to college to get his degree and later became an investment advisor. In 2010, he was named one of the 50 greatest players in Minnesota Twins history.

See also

List of Major League Baseball annual triples leaders

References

External links

1954 births
Living people
Major League Baseball second basemen
Major League Baseball third basemen
Major League Baseball Rookie of the Year Award winners
Minnesota Twins players
Wisconsin Rapids Twins players
Orlando Twins players
Baseball players from Illinois
New Trier High School alumni
Rollins Tars baseball players
Sportspeople from Evanston, Illinois